The River Mersey is in northwest England, flowing past Liverpool.

Mersey may also refer to:

Places
 Mersea Island, off the coast of Essex in England (formerly Mersey Island)
 Electoral division of Mersey in the state of Tasmania, Australian
 Mersey Forest, Tasmania, a locality in Australia

Rivers
 Mersey River (Tasmania) in Australia
 Mersey River (Nova Scotia), in Canada

Ships etc.
 Mersey (1801 ship), wrecked off Torres Strait, Australia, in 1805
 Mersey (1894 ship), a Nourse Line and White Star Line vessel scrapped in 1923
 Mersey-class lifeboat, lifeboats operating around Britain and Ireland
 , a ferry operating across the Irish Sea

People
 Robert Mersey (1917–1994), American music arranger and record producer